Alexander Fotheringham (1870 – after 1900) was a Scottish professional footballer who played as a full-back for Sunderland.

References

1870 births
Footballers from Inverness
Scottish footballers
Association football fullbacks
Caledonian F.C. players
Sunderland A.F.C. players
Nottingham Forest F.C. players
English Football League players
Year of death missing